The Freund–Heintz House is a registered historic building in Cincinnati, Ohio, listed in the National Register on August 21, 2003.

Historic uses 
Single Dwelling

Notes

External links
Documentation from the University of Cincinnati

National Register of Historic Places in Cincinnati
Houses in Cincinnati
Houses on the National Register of Historic Places in Ohio